Pablo Barrachina Estevan (31 October 1912 – 13 October 2008) was a Spanish Bishop of the Roman Catholic Church.

Pablo Barrachina Estevan was born  in Jérica, Spain. He was ordained a priest on 13 July 1941 of the Sergorbe Diocese. He was appointed bishop of Orihuela-Alicante Diocese on 31 March 1954 and ordained bishop on 29 June 1954.  Pablo Barrachina Estevan  retired as bishop of Orihuela-Alicante Diocese on 12 May 1989.

References

External links
Catholic Hierarchy
Diocese Site 

1912 births
2008 deaths
Participants in the Second Vatican Council
20th-century Roman Catholic bishops in Spain